Kim Gyeong-hoe (born 22 January 1941) is a South Korean speed skater. She competed in four events at the 1960 Winter Olympics.

References

1941 births
Living people
South Korean female speed skaters
Olympic speed skaters of South Korea
Speed skaters at the 1960 Winter Olympics
Place of birth missing (living people)
20th-century South Korean women